Kosak is a surname.

People
 Artsyom Kosak (born 1977), Belarusian footballer and coach
 Carl Constantine Kosak (born 1934), American author
 Jan Kosak (born 1992), Czech footballer
 Karin Kosak (born 1979), Austrian dressage rider
 Vladimir Košak (1908–1947), Croatian economist and politician

See also 
 
 Kosac

Surnames
Surnames of Belarusian origin
Surnames of Czech origin
Surnames of European origin
Ethnonymic surnames